Saurenchelys taiwanensis is an eel in the family Nettastomatidae (duckbill/witch eels). It was described by Emma Stanislavovna Karmovskaya in 2004. It is a marine, deep water-dwelling eel which is known from the Philippines, in the western Pacific Ocean.

The species epithet "taiwanensis", after Taiwan, was meant to refer to the type locality of the species, despite the holotype specimen being derived from the Philippines.

References

Nettastomatidae
Fish described in 2004